Frank B. Willis (October 10, 1844 – September 9, 1914) was an American politician from Idaho. A Republican, he served as the third lieutenant governor of Idaho.  Willis was elected in 1893 along with Governor William J. McConnell.

He was born in New York in 1844, and he died in 1914 in Lewiston, Idaho of an ulcer complicated by a hemorrhage. At the time of his death he was serving as the City Treasurer of Lewiston.

References

Idaho Republicans
Lieutenant Governors of Idaho
1844 births
1914 deaths
19th-century American politicians